2-Pyrone (α-pyrone or pyran-2-one) is an unsaturated cyclic chemical compound with the molecular formula C5H4O2. It is isomeric with 4-pyrone.

2-Pyrone is used in organic synthesis as a building block for more complex chemical structures because it may participate in a variety of cycloaddition reactions to form bicyclic lactones.  For example, it readily undergoes Diels-Alder reactions with alkynes producing, upon loss of carbon dioxide, substituted benzenes.  The Gogte Synthesis (1938) is a method for the alkylation of certain pyrones with acid chlorides.

Derivatives
The most common natural products containing a 2-pyrone are the bufanolides and kavalactones. Oxovitisin A, a pyranoanthocyanin found in wine, also contains a 2-pyrone element.

6-Amyl-α-pyrone (6PP) is a derivative of 2-pyrone, found in animal foods and heated beef. Due to its good organoleptic properties with coconut aroma, it is used as flavor enhancer in the food industry. Biologically, it is produced by Trichoderma species via solid state fermentation.

Derivatives of 2-pyrone play a role as signalling molecules in bacterial communication, similar to quorum sensing. Cells with LuxR-type receptors, but lacking its homolog LuxI (and thus unable to produce N-acylhomoserine lactone QS signaling molecules) are known as LuxR "solos", to which pyrones bind as ligands facilitating cell-cell communication.

See also
 Pyrone

References